Sir Edward Cecil George Cadogan, KBE, CB (15 November 1880 – 13 September 1962) was a British, Conservative politician.

Cadogan was a younger son of the 5th Earl Cadogan and his wife, Beatrix, a daughter of the 2nd Earl Craven. He was educated at Eton and Balliol College, Oxford before training as a barrister.

From 1911 to 1921, he was Secretary to the Speaker of the House of Commons, James Lowther and also fought in World War I as a Major in the Suffolk Yeomanry. Lowther retired in 1921 and Cadogan was awarded the CB that year. A year later, he entered the Commons as Member of Parliament (MP) for Reading in 1922. He subsequently represented the seats of Finchley and Bolton and was a member of the Indian Statutory Commission from 1927 to 1930.

Cadogan was interested in penal reform, and particularly in the problems of young offenders.  He chaired a committee which unanimously recommended abolishing the sentence of whipping (except in prisons), a provision adopted by Home Secretary James Chuter Ede in the Criminal Justice Act 1948.  He was knighted in 1939 and fought with the RAF during World War II. He died unmarried and childless in 1962.

References

External links 
 
 

1880 births
1962 deaths
Conservative Party (UK) MPs for English constituencies
Knights Commander of the Order of the British Empire
Companions of the Order of the Bath
Alumni of Balliol College, Oxford
People educated at Eton College
Royal Air Force officers
UK MPs 1922–1923
UK MPs 1924–1929
UK MPs 1929–1931
UK MPs 1931–1935
UK MPs 1935–1945
Younger sons of earls
Royal Air Force personnel of World War II
E
Suffolk Yeomanry officers
People educated at St David's College, Llandudno